The Armenia men's national tennis team represents Armenia in Davis Cup tennis competitions and are governed by the Armenian Tennis Federation.

Armenia currently competes in the fourth group of Europe zone. They reached the Group II quarterfinals in 2001.

History
Prior to 1991, Armenian players had been represented by the Soviet Union. Armenia competed in its first Davis Cup in 1996.

Current team (2022) 

 Mikayel Avetisyan
 Sedrak Khachatryan
 Ashot Mkrtchyan
 Henrik Nikoghosyan
 Robert Yedigaryan

See also

Davis Cup
Armenia Fed Cup team
Fed Cup

External links

Davis Cup teams
Davis Cup
Davis Cup